Strange Fascination is a 1952 American film noir directed by Hugo Haas, starring Cleo Moore, himself and Mona Barrie. This was the first of six films pairing Haas and Moore.

Plot
The life of Paul Marvan (Haas), a world-famous concert pianist, is ruined after his marriage to beautiful femme fatale Margo (Moore).  Margo is hardly a femme fatale.  She's one of many blondes in Hugo Haas' films who is trying to do her best with men coming at her every second.  She's actually sensitive, smart and compassionate.  If you actually listen to the dialogue of this movie it's quite grown up, especially the final conversation between Margo and Marvan's patron, Diana Fowler.  The level of honesty in this film is as powerful as it is unexpected.

It has also been noted, especially by Czech scholar Milan Hain, that the plot also recalls Hugo Haas' brother Pavel (1899-1944) who died in the camps.  Not only does the main character take on the career of a musician, but his brother's name as well.

Cast
 Cleo Moore as Margo
 Hugo Haas as Paul Marvan
 Mona Barrie as Diana Fowler
 Rick Vallin as Carlo
 Karen Sharpe as June Fowler

References

External links
 
 
 
 

1952 films
1952 drama films
American drama films
American black-and-white films
Films directed by Hugo Haas
Columbia Pictures films
Film noir
Films about pianos and pianists
1950s English-language films
1950s American films